Decision at Sundown is a 1957 American Western film directed by Budd Boetticher and starring Randolph Scott. It is one of seven Boetticher/Scott western collaborations, including Seven Men from Now, The Tall T, Buchanan Rides Alone, Westbound, Ride Lonesome, and Comanche Station.

Boetticher said this film and Westbound were the only mediocre films he made as part of the Ranown cycle.

Plot
Bart Allison and his true and faithful friend Sam ride into the town of Sundown. Blinded by hate, Bart has only one thing in mind: to seek revenge from Tate Kimbrough whom he believes had once immorally seduced and then abandoned his wife Mary, which finally led to her committing suicide. At least this is the story Allison believes. More probably his wife at that time had fallen out of love with him and intended to leave him, being genuinely attracted to the womanizing Tate, who later spurned her and renounced their relationship. Tate has taken political and economic control of the little town of Sundown. The citizens don't appreciate him but yield to his influence probably out of fear and material interest.

The very day that Bart shows up in the town, Tate is preparing to get married to Lucy Summerton, the "finest and prettiest young lady" in Sundown, according to the barber in whose shop Bart finds an opportunity to get a shave. He intends to stop the ceremony from taking place by objecting to the wedding after the priest's traditional question. Tate has no real romantic interest in Lucy; the marriage is probably part of a scheme that will fortify his influence in the town. To the disapproval of Lucy's father, Tate spends time with Ruby James with whom he is probably sentimentally involved but also a little rough-mannered. She is supposed to leave town after the ceremony but she insists on attending the wedding in the church despite Tate's disapproval. She even has the nerve to sit on the front pew with the town's doctor, John Storrow, secretly also in love with Lucy and having a great moral and humane influence in the town, helping everybody out as well as making various hints at a possible opposition to Kimbrough's greedy control of the local community. Bart does not hesitate to show his animosity concerning the local boss and even goes as far as creating tension between him and the sheriff Swede Hansen, refusing to have his drinks paid in honor of Tate Kimbrough's wedding. After succeeding in spoiling the whole ceremony and in staying unscratched in a shootout, Bart & Sam find refuge in the local livery stable. The bride refuses to go on with the ceremony until the situation is cleared.

The doctor and Morley Chase, a local opposing ranch owner, show a certain understanding of Bart's predicament. Doctor Storrow is coming to the livery stable to take care of Spanish, one of Kimbrough's wounded hired guns. He tells about his strong resentment concerning Tate's bad influence in the town since he came to take it over. Anxious and in a hurry to get rid of this unexpected opponent, Tate decides to pretend to propose Bart a deal: he wants to make him believe that if he leaves the livery stable, he will let him ride away out of town unharmed. Mr. Summerton, the bride's father, is trying to talk Bart into accepting the deal. He even suggests adding an interesting amount of money to convince the man. The deceptive proposal is rejected and Tate's bride persists in refusing to resume the wedding ceremony. She thinks everything over and ends up reconsidering her relationship with Tate whose affairs with Ruby and also previously Mary make her feel uncomfortable. Lucy goes to the livery stable and makes Bart realize that maybe his deceased wife was not so faithful and trustworthy as he might have imagined, trying thus to reduce Bart's obsession with killing Tate. Bart violently throws her out but starts thinking. Sam tries to confirm Lucy's point of view but gets his head knocked off by an infuriated Bart. Sam is allowed to have lunch at the local restaurant since the possibility to leave unharmed is also valid for him. Unfortunately Spanish shoots him in the back when he announces he wants to ride out of town. This outrageous killing contributes to the people's change of heart concerning Tate and the opposition to the local boss is growing. Storrow addresses the people's consciences at the saloon and stirs up further the emotions. Morley Chase and his men take sides with Storrow and Bart and therefore disarm some of Kimbrough's men. The local boss loses his effective power.

Nevertheless, they give the sheriff back his gun so that the situation amounts to a showdown between Sheriff Hanson and Bart Allison. The latter is faster on the draw and shoots Kimbrough's sheriff down. Yet unluckily, he injures himself on the palm of his hand. While bandaging Bart's hand, Storrow tries to talk him out of a showdown with Tate Kimbrough who thinks he can win back his power if he shoots the disturber. On her side, Ruby is trying to make Tate renounce and leave town but the man doesn't let her convince him. He shows certain anxiety but his courage makes him go down and face Bart.

Tate gets out into the street to meet Bart but to everyone's surprise, Ruby shoots him in the arm with a Winchester to wound him and save his life, forcing him to abandon the confrontation. Bart wants him to take his gun and resume the fight but Ruby tries to explain to him his hate is not worth it since he "never had a wife". Storrow confirms her point saying he has learned it from Sam. Ruby and the injured Tate withdraw and Bart lets it happen, finally accepting the bitter truth after three years. Ruby and a beaten but living Kimbrough leave the town in a buggy. Bart drowns his blues in drinks and rejects the townpeople's friendly attitude, once more refusing to have his drinks paid. He would have preferred Chase to manifest himself before Sam's death, which would have changed a lot of things. A depressed and drunk Bart Allison rides out of the town he unwillingly freed mourning his lost friend Sam.

Cast
Randolph Scott as Bart Allison
John Carroll as Tate Kimbrough
Karen Steele as Lucy Summerton
Valerie French as Ruby James
Noah Beery Jr. as Sam
John Archer as Dr. John Storrow
Andrew Duggan as Sheriff Swede Hansen
James Westerfield as Otis, the bartender
John Litel as Charles Summerton
Ray Teal as Morley Chase
Vaughn Taylor as Mr. Baldwin, the barber
Richard Deacon as Reverend Zaron
H. M. Wynant as Deputy Spanish
Bob Steele as Irv (uncredited)
Abel Fernandez as Pete (uncredited) 
Guy Wilkerson as Abe (uncredited)

Home media
In 2008, a DVD box set of five Budd Boetticher films starring Randolph Scott was released. Along with Decision at Sundown  the set includes Buchanan Rides Alone, Comanche Station, Ride Lonesome, and The Tall T.

See also
List of American films of 1957

References

External links

1957 films
1957 Western (genre) films
American Western (genre) films
American films about revenge
Films directed by Budd Boetticher
Films scored by Heinz Roemheld
Columbia Pictures films
Revisionist Western (genre) films
1950s English-language films
1950s American films